Northern Sydney is a large metropolitan area in Sydney, New South Wales, Australia on the north shore of Sydney Harbour and Parramatta River. The region embraces suburbs in Sydney’s north-east, north and inner north west. Northern Sydney is divided into distinctive regions such as the North Shore, Northern Beaches and Forest District.

The region is characterised by pristine waterways with immense greenery, a well-planned public transport system, hilly roads, large plots of manicured land, and substantially large federation and bungalow style homes. Northern Sydney is home to some of Sydney’s most affluent suburbs, large parks and notable landmarks.

History
The western end of Northern Sydney was home to the Wallumettagal (Ryde-Hunters Hill & Western Lane Cove) tribe. The first settlement in the north and in fact the third-earliest in Australia, after Sydney and Parramatta, was at Ryde; then known by the Aboriginal name Wallumetta. The territory from Sydney Cove to Parramatta, on the northern side of the Parramatta River, was thought to be that of the Wallumedegal, and had the aboriginal name Wallumetta, the territory of the Wallumede people.

On 3 January 1792, the first land in the Ryde area was granted to eight marines, along the northern bank of the river between Sydney and Parramatta. The area was named by Governor Phillip the "Field of Mars", Mars being the Roman god of war, named to reflect the military association with these new settlers. Today's Field of Mars Reserve is the remnant of a district which once extended from Dundas to the Lane Cove River. Soon after, these grants were followed by grants to ten emancipated convicts in February 1792, the land being further to the east of the marines grants, thus the area was called Eastern Farms or the Eastern Boundary. The name Eastern Farms then changed to Kissing Point by 1794; a name believed to have originated from the way heavily laden boats passing the Parramatta River bumped or "kissed" the rocky outcrop which extends into the river of Kissing Point today.

Further grants were issued in 1794 and 1795, gradually occupying most of the foreshores between Meadowbank and Gladesville. Some of the grants were at the North Brush, north of the Field of Mars settlement, in the area of Brush Farm and Eastwood. Most of the Grants were small, from 12 to 40 hectares (30 to 100 acres).

By 1803, most of the accessible land had been granted. Settlement was based along the Parramatta River and overlooking ridges. Governor King recognised that most of the smaller settlers had insufficient land for their stock but it was not possible to grant them larger allotments. In 1804, it was decided that a 'traditional English common' - a large area of public land for use by local inhabitants - would be set aside. Six commons were gazetted.
In 1804, an area of 6000 acres of the Field of Mars was decreed as a common. The common stretched from what is now Hunters Hill, through Ryde to Pennant Hills, incorporating a large tract of forest around the Lane Cove River. It was intended as a resource for small settlers, a place for them to graze their livestock and collect firewood, to supplement their farming practices.

The Field of Mars Connect, an area of approximately 2,040 hectares (5,050 acres) located north of the Field of Mars and the Eastern Farms, covered most of the Ryde municipality. The village itself comprised only a modest scattering of houses in a few streets around the church, surrounded by farms, orchards and some large estates. Nevertheless, the name was well established by 12 November 1870 when the Municipal district of Ryde was officially proclaimed.

Today, the Northern Sydney region of Sydney endures as a family-oriented residential area with a vibe of liveability and affluence.

Suburbs and Regions of Northern Sydney

Northern Sydney is described as the area between Port Jackson to the south, Carlingford and suburbs in line to the west/northwest,  Hawkesbury River and Pittwater to the north and the Tasman Sea to the east.

Regions
Northern Sydney is further sub-divided into regions such as the North Shore (the inner north and north-western part of the region between the Lane Cove River and Middle Harbour), Northern Beaches (the northern coastal suburbs to the north-east of Middle Harbour) and Forest District, a small group of suburbs between the Upper North Shore and the Northern Beaches. Despite the region being divided by distinctive definitions, parts of the region are often simply referred to as “Northern Suburbs”, “North” or “North West”, most notably the inner north-western suburbs to the west of the Lane Cove River, such as Epping, Ryde, Melrose Park and Meadowbank.

The Australian Bureau of Statistics defines several statistical areas (SAL-4) that are located in northern Sydney. These are:
 Sydney - Northern Beaches, covering the customary Northern Beaches region northeast of Middle Harbour and south of the Hawkesbury River;
 Sydney - North Sydney and Hornsby, covering the customary upper and lower North Shore regions southwest of Middle Harbour, northeast of the Lane Cove River and south of the Hawkesbury River; and
 Sydney - Ryde, covering the inner north-western region southwest of the Lane Cover River.

Suburbs and localities
This list is not exhaustive.

The suburbs and localities of the Northern Sydney region are:

Culture and sport

Sport is represented in many areas in the region, RydeEastwood Rugby League Club is the local rugby league club in the area, with it covering the area of the famed Holy Cross College, Ryde. This league following can be attributed to the large Catholic population of the early developmental days of Rugby League in Australia, though the area now only retains two Junior rugby league clubs, both feeding to Holy Cross. There are also several Rugby League clubs surrounding the Hornsby area such as the Asquith Magpies (with a large Leagues Club in Waitara), the Pennant Hills Stags and the Hornsby Lions in the North Sydney District Junior Rugby League. Junior Rugby League teams in the Ryde district are in the Balmain District Junior Rugby League, feeding into the Wests Tigers junior development system.

Eastwood District Rugby Union Football Club represents the region in rugby union. It is considered one of the strongest clubs in the Shute Shield, consistently performing well. This club is considered a gateway club for rugby union in the Western Sydney area. Its consistent performance is due to the fact it has established a strong Juniors and Sub-District competition within the area, many children from the area are sent to the elite private schools of Sydney and hold rugby union as the preferred code. Local school St Joseph's College, Hunters Hill, is a traditional rugby school and The King's School, Parramatta to the west help reinforce this strength.

Transport

Northern Sydney is very well serviced by public transport. Two railway lines operate through the region known as the North Shore railway line and the Northern railway line on the Sydney Trains network.

The Sydney Metro Northwest which opened in 2019, crosses Northern Sydney from Chatswood to Epping.

There is also an abundance of bus routes serving the region operated by Busways, Forest Coach Lines, Keolis Downer Northern Beaches and Transdev.

The southern part of this region is frequented by ferry services to the Sydney central business district and westbound towards Parramatta, as well as ferry services to the Sydney CBD from Manly.

The main arterial roads in Northern Sydney are Military Road, the Pacific Highway, the Warringah Freeway, Pennant Hills Road, Ryde Road, Epping Road, Mona Vale Road, Victoria Road, Beecroft Road, Pittwater Road and Wakehurst Parkway.

Landmarks
Northern Sydney has many unique landmarks such as: The Sydney Harbour Bridge, Taronga Zoo in Mosman, Admiralty House (Sydney residence of the Governor-General of Australia), Kirribilli House (Sydney residence of the Prime Minister of Australia), Luna Park, Balmoral Beach, Palm Beach, Gladesville Bridge, Macquarie Centre & Ice Skating Rink and Curzon Hall in Marsfield.

Events and celebrations
The Willoughby Spring Festival is held throughout the Willoughby local government area, in September each year. The festival lasts for a month and features over 40 events including live music/entertainment, exhibitions, cultural celebrations, business events and many more community activities. The highlight is the annual Willoughby StreetFair where the Chatswood CBD is taken over by market stalls, performers, dancers and musicians. The StreetFair features the Willoughby Street Parade which included over 1,000 participants in 2007.

The suburb of Eastwood holds a large event named the Granny Smith Festival held usually in October of each year. The festival's attendance record set in 2004 currently stands at approximately just over 90,000. Many are attracted each year by the live bands, shows, stores, rides, the main street parade down Rowe Street and of course the massive fireworks display in the skies over Eastwood.

Other main festivals/events in Northern Sydney include: Tartan Day at Lane Cove, the Guringgai Festival honouring Northern Sydney's Aboriginals, The Ryde Aquatic Festival & Bridge to Bridge run, the Moocooboola Festival at Hunters Hill the Mosman Festival, Lane Cove's Cammeraygal Festival, Chinese New Year at Chatswood and the Ryde Summer Festival which mainly includes outdoor cinemas. Willoughby also holds an annual art prize.

References

External links
Moocooboola Festival - Official Hunter's Hill Council web site

Regions of Sydney